Nazar Mohammad or similar may refer to:

Nazar Mohammad, Pakistani cricketer
Nazr Mohammed, American basketball player
Nazar Mohammad, Iran